KPFS-LP (100.7 FM) is a low-power FM radio station licensed to Elk City, Oklahoma, United States. The station is currently owned by Western Oklahoma Catholic Faith Foundation

History
The station call sign KPFS-LP on February 28, 2014.

References

External links

http://www.okcr.org

PFS-LP
Radio stations established in 2014
2014 establishments in Oklahoma
PFS-LP
Beckham County, Oklahoma
Catholic radio stations
Catholic Church in Oklahoma